Kennedy Mall is a shopping mall located in Dubuque, Iowa. It is owned by the Cafaro Company. The mall's anchor stores are Edward Jones, Shoe Carnival, Planet Fitness, Vertical Jump Park, JCPenney, Dick's Sporting Goods, Ulta Beauty, and Books-A-Million. There are 2 vacant anchor stores that were once 2 Younkers stores.

History
Kennedy Mall was the first climate-controlled mall in the state of Iowa. In 1964, Montgomery Ward announced that it would move its store in Dubuque, which was located in the downtown area, out to the west end. In February 1966, rezoning of the land on which the mall was built was approved. William M. Cafaro and Associates (now Cafaro Company) of Youngstown, Ohio developed the site. Originally, the three main anchor stores were Younkers, Montgomery Ward, and Roshek's Department Store - which had also moved to the west end.

In the fall of 1968, Younkers was opened. This was followed by Montgomery Ward in the spring of 1969, and Roshek's in the fall of 1970. The mall was formally opened on April 15, 1970, with F. W. Woolworth Company operating as a junior anchor. At the time, it had sixty stores, which made it Iowa's largest enclosed mall. Soon afterward, a tornado had damaged the Dubuque area, including the mall.

Roshek's closed its mall store in 1982, and Montgomery Ward followed suit in 1983. JCPenney then moved from its downtown location into the space that had been previously occupied by Wards. Armstrong Department Stores of Cedar Rapids, Iowa moved into the space previously occupied by Roshek's. In the late 1980s, Armstrong's ceased operations even though the Dubuque store was profitable. At that point, Sears decided to move their store from the south end of Dubuque to Kennedy Mall. They took over the southern half of the store. Younkers eventually decided to expand and moved their men's and houseware departments into the northern half of the building. Today, Books-A-Million, Vertical Jump Park, Dick's Sporting Goods, JCPenney and Planet Fitness make up the anchor stores at Kennedy Mall.

A number of renovations were made to the mall after another tornado struck in 1989. This included opening up a food court at the northeast corner of the mall and a number of cosmetic improvements to the mall.

Originally, there was a General Cinema movie theater with a single 795-seat auditorium located within the mall. In 1972 it was remodeled into a two-screen theater with about 300 seats in each auditorium. In the 1980s, General Cinema built a new six-screen theater named Kennedy Mall Cinema 6 in the parking lot just west of the mall to replace the theater inside the mall. Phoenix Theaters now occupies the space.

Part of the northeast corner of the mall was torn down and rebuilt to accommodate a new Borders book store. The book store took over most of what had previously been the food court area and the mall's Sam Goody store. On July 15, 2011, Borders Group announced it would liquidate all of its stores by September, including the Kennedy Mall location. By the end of July, Books-A-Million acquired 30 Borders stores, including the Kennedy Mall location. Books-A-Million, opened the former Borders spot in late 2011, after renovations were completed.

Best Buy obtained part of the southeast parking lot, which was originally overflow parking, and built their own store at that location.

For many years Walgreens operated a store at Kennedy Mall. This store, with both interior and exterior entrances, sat between the Bishop's Buffet and J.C. Penney store. In 2005 the company built a new, free-standing store about 1/2 mile away at 55 JFK Road. When the new store was opened in late 2005 the company closed the existing store at the mall. Dick's Sporting Goods had the space torn down and rebuilt to accommodate a new store, which opened in late 2010.

On January 22, 2014, it was announced that Sears would be closing by early May.
Vertical Jump Park took over the former Sears and some smaller stores in 2016.

Kennedy Mall announced Phoenix Theatres that will replace Mindframe Theaters in March 2018

In April 2018, Younkers parent company announced they would be closing all stores, including the two stores at the Kennedy Mall. The two stores permanently closed on August 29, 2018. It is now unclear what the two anchor stores will become. With half of the Younkers store used for the seasonal Spirit Halloween every few years.

Renovation
In April 2007, the Cafaro Company announced that it was moving forward with plans to renovate Kennedy Mall. The project will be completed in 2 phases, with work beginning in 2007. Changes to the mall included the replacement of floors, entrances, landscaping, and parking lots. Also, skylights were be installed, and the east front of the mall was re-configured to enable more stores to face Wacker Drive. The first phase cost an estimated $2.9 million.

The interior renovation was met warmly from local residents. As part of the plan, the mall's signature center water fountain was removed to make room for retail space. The fountain had not been active in years and was more of an eyesore than anything else.  Many of the 37-year-old mall's parking lots, sidewalks, light posts, signage, landscaping, and exterior walls were in disrepair, and were completely renovated by the fall of 2008. A new children's play area, sponsored by The Finley Hospital, was open in late June 2008. The renovation was a result of the positive business climate in the area as well as the addition of additional retailers in the area, proving that Dubuque was ready for redevelopment of the mall. The upcoming work was only the second significant renovation in the 37 years the mall has been open.

Anchors
 JCPenney
 Best Buy Electronics and appliances
 Dick's Sporting Goods Sporting retail store. Opened in Fall 2010.
 Books-A-Million (opened late 2011 in former Borders space, which was closed in September due to liquidation)

References

External links
 Kennedy Mall Website

Buildings and structures in Dubuque, Iowa
Economy of Dubuque, Iowa
Shopping malls in Iowa
Shopping malls established in 1970
Cafaro Company
Tourist attractions in Dubuque, Iowa
1970 establishments in Iowa